Daniel Stock (born 16 September 1992) is a Norwegian cross-country skier.

He competed at the 2012 Junior World Championships, later in the U23 age class at the 2014 Junior World Championships where he won the bronze medal in the 30 km skiathlon.

He made his World Cup debut in March 2014 in the Holmenkollen 50 km race, collecting his first World Cup points in the 2015 edition of the same race with a 25th place. In January 2017 in Ulricehamn he finished fifth in the 15 km race, and in February 2017 in Pyeongchang, South Korea,  he finished second in the 30 km skiathlon.

He represents the sports club Vadsø SK.

Cross-country skiing results
All results are sourced from the International Ski Federation (FIS).

World Cup

Season standings

Individual podiums
 1 podium – (1 )

References 

1992 births
Living people
People from Vadsø
Norwegian male cross-country skiers
Sportspeople from Troms og Finnmark